Cyrtoxipha columbiana, the Columbian trig, is a species of winged bush crickets, trigs in the family Gryllidae.

References

Further reading

External links

 

Crickets
Insects described in 1907